Jōichirō, Joichiro, Jouichirou or Johichiroh (written: 丈一郎 or 穣一郎) is a masculine Japanese given name. Notable people with the name include:

 (1897–1957), Japanese general
 (born 1970), Japanese boxer

Japanese masculine given names